The 1989 South Asian Games, officially the IV South Asian Federation Games, were held in Islamabad, Pakistan from 20 October to 28 October 1989. Muhammad Ali appeared as a special guest at the closing ceremony.

The Games

Participating nations 
Seven countries competed.

Sports 
Squash was introduced for the first time in 1989 games. It replaced basketball from the previous games.

 Aquatics
  Athletics
  Boxing
  Football
  Kabaddi (Circle style)
  Squash (debut)
  Swimming
  Table tennis
  Volleyball
  Weightlifting
  Wrestling

Medal tally
Host nation Pakistan finished in 2nd place with a total of 97 medals (42 gold, 33 silver, and 22 bronze).

See also 

 South Asian Games celebrated in Pakistan
 1989 South Asian Games – Islamabad
 2004 South Asian Games – Islamabad
 2023 South Asian Games – Lahore
 South Asian Games

References

 
South Asian Games
S
S
South Asian Games, 1989
1989 in Asian sport
Multi-sport events in Pakistan
Sports competitions in Islamabad